Du betyr meg  is an album by Norwegian rapper Lars Vaular. It was released on 31 October 2011. The first single from the album, "Som i en siste dans", was released on 23 October 2011.

Track listing

Charts

References

Lars Vaular albums
2011 albums
Norwegian-language albums